Headlander Festival was a small UK family friendly festival held on the ground of Stockport RUFC in Bramhall, with the first two-day event being held from 21 June to 22 June 2013. The two-day event attracted around 6,000 music fans each year.

The Festival was designed to be accessible to families with children of all ages and featured three stages for live music, a trade village, foods from around the world and music workshops.

2013
Acts who appeared at the first Headlander Festival included; A Few Good Men, The Rainband, The Beavers, Kill For Company, The Ordinary, Reachback and Manchester Ska Foundation.

2014
Toploader headlined the 2014 festival which also saw appearances from The Mend, Stooshe, Kazo, The Feud, Jeramiah Ferrari, The High Nines, Daisy Day, A Few Good Men and Swampgrass.

2015
Acts appearing over 20 & 21 June 2015 included:
 Roachford
 From The Jam
 Jeramiah Ferrari
 My Darling Clementine
 Philip Henry & Hannah Martin
 Son Of Dave
 Clive Gregson
 Hat Fitz and Cara
 Chickenbone John
 Alex McKnow
 Kazo
 James Michael
 Isembard's Wheel
 Dave Sharp
 Doug Perkins and The Spectaculars
 Tree House Fire!
 The Hummingbirds
 Route 66
 The Hayes Sisters 
 Lucky T Jackson

References

External links

Music festivals in Greater Manchester
Rock festivals in the United Kingdom
Pop music festivals in the United Kingdom
Music festivals established in 2013